Serge Rudaz (born August 19, 1954, pronounced "Rü-DAH") is a Canadian theoretical physicist and Professor of Physics at the University of Minnesota.  He previously served as the Director of Undergraduate Studies of the University of Minnesota's Physics Department,  and is now the Director of Undergraduate Honors at the University of Minnesota. Rudaz received his Ph.D. in 1979 from Cornell University and his undergraduate degree from McGill University.

Teaching

In the spring of 2007, Rudaz was named as the director of the University of Minnesota's new campus-wide Honors program, which began operation during the fall of 2008.

Research
In 1995, he was elected Fellow of the American Physical Society "for original and influential contributions to the phenomenology of heavy quarks, supersymmetry and grand unification, and particle astrophysics." In 1985, Rudaz was the recipient of the Canadian Association of Physicists Herzberg Medal.  He is the only physicist in the Herzberg Medal's history from a non-Canadian institution.

Rudaz's research interests include:
unified theories of elementary particle interactions and their phenomenology, applications to cosmology and the particle/astrophysics interface
relativistic many-body physics, including phase transitions in field theories at finite temperature and density; models of hadronic interactions
physics of topological defect formation in the early universe and in condensed systems

See also
 Penguin diagrams

References

External links
Serge Rudaz's Curriculum Vitae
Head of the Class
Serge Rudaz named founding director of new University Honors Program

1954 births
Living people
McGill University alumni
Cornell University alumni
Canadian physicists
Particle physicists
University of Minnesota faculty
Fellows of the American Physical Society